The World War II Soviet submarine L-3 belonged to the L-class or Leninets class of minelayer submarines. It had been named Bolshevik and later Frunzenets, before it was decided that submarines should stop having names and carry numbers instead.

Under Captain of the 3rd Rank Vladimir Konovalov, L-3 was one of the most successful Soviet submarines of World War II. On 16 April 1945, it sank the German refugee transport MV Goya, an event that (if calculated by loss of life) is deemed to be one of the worst marine disasters ever, when 6,000 to 7,000 people died in the icy waters of the Baltic Sea.

After the dismantling of the submarine, part of it was used as the monument in Liepāja, though the monument was relocated to Moscow in 1995. Today, the conning tower of L-3 is on display in Moscow as a monument in Park Pobedy ("Victory Park") at Poklonnaya Gora museum.

Mines laid by L-3 also damaged the German sailing vessel Albert Leo Schlageter (1634 GRT) and the German icebreaker Pollux (4191 GRT).

L-3 is the twelfth-highest-scoring Soviet submarine (not counting ships sunk by mines she laid), with 10,722 GRT sunk.

Trivia 
In the book and subsequent film The Hunt for Red October, the fictional Soviet Alfa class nuclear-powered attack submarine is named the V.K. Konovalov.

References 

World War II submarines of the Soviet Union
1931 ships
Leninets-class submarines
Museum ships in Russia